Padasjoki is a municipality of Finland. It is located in the province of Southern Finland and is part of the Päijänne Tavastia region.

The municipality is unilingually Finnish.

Padasjoki is known as a summer cottage municipality. By number, it has more holiday homes than permanent residents.

History 
The earliest information on the administrative parish of Padasjoki is from 1442. Most of the villages of Padasjoki were established during the Middle Ages, being mentioned in sources from the 15th century.

In 2020, Padasjoki was the setting of a video and choral tribute by the YL Male Voice Choir to the song Pohjois-Karjala, by Leevi and the Leavings and Gösta Sundqvist. The video, seen over 100,000 times in a single day, credits the city of Padasjoki as well as some local businesses and features several rural views including a farm, swamps, a wooden bus stop, a barber shop and a Matkahuolto station with a visible "Padasjoki" sign.

Sights and events 
In February, Padasjoki hosts 7.5 km long annual full moon skiing event and competition on the frozen Lake Päijänne. In March there is another skiing event on Lake Päijänne called Postihiihto. Week before midsummer it's time for annual nude run event Nakukymppi held in Vesijako village. During the first weekend of July Sahtimarkkinat a home-brewed beer market is held in Padasjoki village centre. The Padasjoki Marina also loans itself every second year as the starting point for a sailing competition (Päijännepurjehdus).

Museums 

 Enni Ids Cabin
 The Granary Museum
 The Palsa Mill Museum
 The Torittu Village Smithy Museum

Art 

 Gallery Pikantti
 Ala-Savi’s Art 
 Ars Arrakoski
 Ars Auttoinen

Nature 

 Päijänne National Park
 Evo Hiking Area
 Tuomastornit observation towers

References

External links

Municipality of Padasjoki – Official website 

 
Populated places established in the 1440s